Scottsdale National Golf Club (SNGC) is a private golf club located north of the McDowell Mountain Range, and just east of Pinnacle Peak in Scottsdale, Arizona. It is owned by Bob Parsons, an American entrepreneur, who is the founder of GoDaddy and Parsons Xtreme Golf, and his wife, Renee, president of PXG Apparel. The property provides an uncontested 360-degree views and is protected on three sides by preservation wilderness.

History 

Until 2013, the course was known as The Golf Club of Scottsdale. It was renamed by Parsons after he acquired the golf course for $600,000. In 2014, he unveiled a $35 million plan to redevelop some of the course's holes and build a new clubhouse. Since that time, a second clubhouse and member villas have been constructed, and Parsons has invested about $250 million in the property.

Scottsdale National Golf Club now consists of two 18-hole courses and a nine-hole course. The original course, called Mine Shaft, is a par 72 spread across 290 acres (1.2 km2) designed by Jay Morrish and Dick Bailey. The second course, called The Other Course is a par-72 links course designed by Jackson Kahn Design. The 9-hole par-3 course is called The Bad Little Nine, also designed by Jackson Kahn Design. According to Today's Golfer, the 9-hole course is considered as one of the “trickiest” courses in the world. Parsons has kept an offer on the table to give a golfer $1,000 if he or she finishes under par when the flags are in their trickiest locations.

The club also has an extensive practice facility, which includes a driving range more than 400 yards deep, a short game area, and five different bunker and green scenarios.

In 2017, construction was completed on new contemporary villas for members, which feature local artwork, as well as a second clubhouse. Members can bring guests and stay on property to golf, dine, access the spa facilities and other amenities.

Scorecards

Tournaments 
SNGC hosts the annual Wild West Invitational tournament. It's a three-day event for women and a four-day event for men with luxury food and drinks, and gifts for all of the players. The player's objective is to win their flight and proceed to the final round, called The Stampede. In The Stampede, competitors must contend with a number of distractions that could include mobile deejays with music blaring over loudspeakers, sounds of jackhammers and helicopters, and even Bob Parsons heckling players with a bullhorn.

Golf Immersion Program 
The Xperience is a three-days golf immersion program at SNGC that includes PXG club fittings for two people by a PXG master fitter. The day after the clubs are  fitted, they are delivered to the participants for their playing rounds on all three golf courses. The Xperience also includes a tour of the club, accommodations and dinners.

References 

Golf clubs and courses in Arizona
Sports venues in Scottsdale, Arizona